Priest...Live! is the second live album by English heavy metal band Judas Priest, recorded at The Omni, Atlanta, Georgia on 15 June 1986 and the Reunion Arena, Dallas, Texas on 27 June 1986.

Overview
All of the songs on Priest...Live! were recorded on their 1986 Fuel for Life tour which supported the album Turbo. There were no tracks from their 1970s albums, though the 2001 remastered version did contain "Hell Bent for Leather" as a bonus track. While it may have sounded more "live" than Unleashed in the East, Priest...Live! did not sell as well as that album. However, the RIAA certified it Gold in October 2001.

The version of "Heading Out to the Highway" on this album includes separate guitar solos by K. K. Downing and Glenn Tipton that were not on the original studio version, while the performance of "Breaking the Law" includes an additional Downing solo.

The album was first released on 8 June 1987 as a 2-LP set in a gatefold sleeve with artwork inners. It was re-released as part of the 2001 'The Re-Masters' series and includes three live bonus tracks.

The live video was recorded in its entirety at the Reunion Arena in Dallas, Texas on 27 June 1986, and was released on Betamax, VHS and LaserDisc in 1987. The video includes the songs "Locked In", "Desert Plains", "The Green Manalishi (With the Two Prong Crown)" and "Hell Bent for Leather", which were left off the original vinyl/cassette/CD release, and was certified Gold in February 1988.
The video for this concert was featured on the Judas Priest DVD Electric Eye in 2003.

Track listing

Original release

2001 'The Re-Masters' edition track listing

Personnel
Judas Priest
Rob Halford – vocals
K. K. Downing – guitar
Glenn Tipton – guitar
Ian Hill – bass
Dave Holland – drums

Production
Produced by Tom Allom
Engineered by Patrice Wilkison Levinsohn, assisted by Charles Dye
Mastered by Mike Fuller
Art direction by Richard Evans (designer)Richard Evans
Photography by Neil Zlozower

Charts

Certifications

References

Judas Priest live albums
1987 live albums
Albums produced by Tom Allom
Columbia Records live albums